Tuacahn High School for the Arts was the first public charter high school in the state of Utah, United States. Tuacahn High School for the Arts is now permanently closed. It was located in Ivins, just outside St. George. The school offers a full college preparatory curriculum while focusing in-depth on the various areas of the performing arts. Students attending the school choose a studio with which to align their studies: Performance Studio, Music Studio, Media Arts Studio, and Visual Arts Studio.

Tuacahn High School students produced numerous music and dance concerts each year as well as plays and musicals in the Orval and Ruth Hafen Theatre (380 seats). Because Tuacahn High School was directly connected to the Tuacahn Center for the Arts, students often performed its spring musical in the 2,020-seat outdoor amphitheatre.

History
Tuacahn High School for the Arts was founded as Tuacahn High School for the Performing Arts in 1999 as Utah's first charter high school. While first created as a music and dance conservatory, in association with Tuacahn Center for the Arts, Kevin Smith worked to create a high school for performing arts. In 2019 it was announced that the school would change its name, dropping "performing", to reflect expanded offerings of visual arts, technical theatre, film, and audio production. THSA closed its doors permanently on May 30, 2021, and transferred the charter to Utah Arts Academy, which will be located in St. George, Utah.

Academics
Class offerings include four possible years of mathematics credits and an honors alternative; four years of English credits and corresponding honors courses; a three 1/2 credit hour history curriculum; five possible science credits; and a variety of technology, health, and social science courses to accompany the arts.

Tuacahn is mid-to-high level in comparison academically to other schools of the same size, both charter and public, but above state average in ELA (English Language Arts). The school offers AP courses in Literature & Composition, Statistics, Music Theory and Studio Art, as well as a full ACT prep curriculum to all students grades 9-11.

In 2007, Tuacahn was selected as Innovative Charter School of the Year. In 2010, it was selected as Outstanding Charter High School.

References

External links

 Tuacahn High School
 Dixie State University Box Office

Charter schools in Utah
Educational institutions established in 1999
Public high schools in Utah
Schools in Washington County, Utah
1999 establishments in Utah